Daniel Andersen (25 November 1885 – 30 April 1959) was a Danish composer, sculptor, and ceramist.  He studied music in Vienna; among his compositions are a handful of religious works and an opera, Madonnas Ansigt.

References
DVM profile, Danish State Library et al.
Gravsted profile

Danish composers
Male composers
1885 births
1959 deaths
20th-century Danish sculptors
Male sculptors
20th-century Danish male artists
20th-century Danish ceramists
20th-century Danish male musicians